Thomas (Tomas or Tom) Huppert (born 1942) is an alpine skier from New Zealand.

He competed for New Zealand at the 1968 Winter Olympics at Grenoble, and came 61st in the Downhill and 75th in the Giant Slalom. He was the flagbearer for New Zealand at the Games ceremony.

References 
 Black Gold by Ron Palenski (2008, 2004 New Zealand Sports Hall of Fame, Dunedin) p. 105

External links 
 
 

Living people
1942 births
New Zealand male alpine skiers
Olympic alpine skiers of New Zealand
Alpine skiers at the 1968 Winter Olympics